Daviesia localis is a species of flowering plant in the family Fabaceae and is endemic to a restricted area of the south-west of Western Australia. It is an erect, spreading shrub with spine-tipped branchlets, scattered, spreading, curved, needle-shaped, sharply-pointed phyllodes and orange-yellow and red flowers with a v-shaped central mark.

Description

Taxonomy and naming
Daviesia localis was first formally described in 2015 by Michael Clyde Hislop in the journal Nuytsia from specimens collected north of Bindoon in 2002. The specific epithet (localis) means "local, belonging to a given place", referring to the restricted range of the species.

Distribution and habitat
This daviesia grows is only known from a single population in the Bindoon area where it grows in forest.

Conservation status
Daviesia localis is listed as "Priority One" by the Government of Western Australia Department of Biodiversity, Conservation and Attractions, meaning that it is known from only one or a few locations which are potentially at risk.

References

localis
Eudicots of Western Australia
Plants described in 2015